Tanino Gimlet (foaled May 4, 1999) is a retired racehorse by Brian's Time, out of Tanino Crystal. He sired many winning horses, including Vodka.

Life
Tanino Gimlet was born in Urakawa, Hokkaido. He is a bay, retired stallion by Brain's Time, out of Tanino Crystal. Tanino was a racehorse for 2–4 years before retiring to become a breeding stud.

To fulfill his breeding life, Tanino was moved to Rex stud on November 30, 2013. Since 2014, he has lived a stallion in the same place.

Racing Career
He debuted at Sapparo racecourse, taking second place. Afterwards, some of his other major wins were at the Arlington Cup, and Fuji TV Sho Spring Stakes. Tanino at the Tokyo Racecourse also won, with jockey Yutaka Take mounting him.

In the Tsutsuki Awards, Tanino was once again popularized by 2.6 times the number one, behind fourth place again. However, in the race, the front two could not be exchanged but lost to 3 landings. Winning was the 15th most popular Norrison who got out of favor. In this case, it was often said that it was a clear mountaineering mistake on the rough ride of the fourth place, and the commentator also said that "Tanino Gimlet was running 100 meters extra for only one head." The winning time was 1 minute 58 seconds 5 for Tsukiyuki Prize record, Norrison's win worth a million horse tickets.

However, as soon as the autumn season came, the Kikka Newspaper Cup from the Kobe Newspaper Cup Rotation aimed at the chrysanthemum flower. The older classed horses were developed and retired. Tanino's retirement ceremony was held at Sapporo racecourse on August 24, 2003. He became a breeding stud due to a bowed tendon.

Stud Career
During his breeding life, Tanino has sired many foals. The most notable offspring is Vodka, who won the Tokyo Yushun for the first time in 64 years as a filly. Other notable offsprings include Hagino Hybrid, who won the Kyoto Shimbun Hai, and Midsummer Fair, who won the Flora Stakes.

Tanino Gimlet retired from stud in 2020, and is pensioned at the Versailles Farm.

Pedigree 

Tanino Gimlet's family number is F9-c, and has an inbreeding of Graustark (S3xM4), Sicambre (M4xM5), and Roman (S5xM5).

References 

1999 racehorse births
Racehorses bred in Japan
Racehorses trained in Japan
Thoroughbred family 3-h